A fifteen-part constitutional referendum was held in Colombia on 25 October 2003. Whilst all fifteen proposals were approved by voters, only one question had a sufficient numbers of votes to pass the 25% quorum requirement.

Background
After taking office in August 2002, President Álvaro Uribe put forward several constitutional reforms. The Congress approved the proposals on 20 December 2002, but also suggested several changes, including reducing the size of the Chamber of Representatives and the Senate by a fifth rather than creating a unicameral Congress, and forcing parties that received less than 2% of the vote in elections to disband.

Uribe subsequently signed the changes into law, and they were submitted to the Constitutional Court on 22 January 2003. On 9 July the Court passed judgement that the referendum was valid, but that four questions were not acceptable.

Under articles 374 and 378 of the Constitution, proposed amendments to the constitution require a quorum of 25% of registered voters casting a valid vote, and a majority of those who have voted to vote in favour.

Results

Aftermath
Following the referendum, President Uribe objected to the presence of 700,000 voters on the electoral roll, whose removal would have meant nine of the fifteen questions passing the quorum. However, his protests were rejected by the National Electoral Council on 19 December 2003.

References

2003 referendums
2003 in Colombia
2003
Pension referendums
Constitutional referendums